Les Enfants Terribles is a phrase in French that translates as "the terrible children" or "the holy terrors", and may refer to:

 Les Enfants Terribles, a 1929 novel by Jean Cocteau, its English title being "The Holy Terrors"
 Les Enfants Terribles (film), a 1950 film of the novel, with collaboration by the author
 Les Enfants Terribles (opera), an opera composed by Philip Glass, based on the novel
 A fictional laboratory project from the Metal Gear video game universe
 The Infant Terrible, a Marvel Comics character

See also
L'enfant terrible